Terence Lightfoot (21 May 1935 – 15 March 2013) was a British jazz clarinettist and bandleader, and together with Chris Barber, Acker Bilk and Kenny Ball was one of the leading members of the trad jazz generation of British jazzmen.

Early life
Lightfoot was born in Potters Bar, Middlesex, England. He started his musical career as a vocalist during school life, singing popular songs with a small amateur variety group. In 1949, he came to jazz while at Enfield Grammar School in Enfield Town. He changed from playing the trumpet to clarinet to meet the needs of the traditional Dixieland jazz band of his friends. After leaving school, he formed his first jazz band, the Wood Green Stompers.

Trad jazz
In 1955, he formed his band, Terry Lightfoot's New Orleans Jazzmen. They had three minor hits in the UK Singles Chart in 1961 and 1962, "True Love", "King Kong" and "Tavern in the Town". The Jazzmen made regular appearances on Sunday nights at the Wood Green Jazz Club.

Death
Lightfoot died in Milton Keynes General Hospital on 15 March 2013, aged 77, after suffering with prostate cancer.

References

External links

1935 births
2013 deaths
Deaths from cancer in England
Deaths from prostate cancer
English bandleaders
English jazz clarinetists
People educated at Enfield Grammar School
People from Potters Bar
Musicians from Hertfordshire